Kuwait Petroleum International, often referred to by its trademark Q8 (pronounced Cue-Eight, or Kuwait), refines and markets fuel, lubricants and other petroleum products in Europe. Established in 1983, it is the international subsidiary of Kuwait Petroleum Corporation. It supplies 4,000 retail filling stations, as well as direct sales operations delivering fuel and heating oil to domestic and industrial users.  Q8 also operates an International Diesel Service (IDS) - a secure fuel card service supported by automated technology for international road transportation companies - in more than 700 located sites throughout Europe.  Q8 also has a significant aviation business marketing jet fuel at more than 40 airports worldwide and a lubricants business with five lubricants blending plants, direct sales and marketing activities across Europe and export sales to over 75 countries worldwide.

History 

 1938    Discovery of oil in Kuwait
 1975    Nationalisation of oil wells in Kuwait
 1980    Foundation of Kuwait Petroleum Corporation
 1983	Foundation of Kuwait Petroleum International Limited - Acquisition Gulf Oil in the Benelux, Sweden and Denmark
 1984	Acquisition of Gulf Oil in Italy
 1986	Acquisition of Hays Petroleum Services (which had previously been owned by the Kuwait Investment Office, and used the Pace Petroleum brand) and Ultramar in the UK - Introduction of the Q8 brand
 1987	Acquisition of BP in Denmark
 1987	Acquisition of the Soviet-controlled Nafta in Britain
 1990	Acquisition of Mobil Oil in Italy
 1997	Joint Venture with Agip - Milazzo refinery in Sicily
 1998	Joint Venture OK Petroleum and KPI in Sweden, establishing the OKQ8 brand
 1998	Acquisition of BP retail Belgium
 1999	Acquisition of Aral Belgium
 2004	Acquisition of Tango unmanned sites from Petroplus in the Netherlands (62 sites), Belgium (4 sites) and Spain(1 site); these are typically now branded "Q8 Easy"
 2004	Sale of UK operations to a consortium operating under the name Pace Petroleum
 2005	Sale of Thai operations to the Malaysian company Petronas
 2006	Sale of German operation (which had 37 service stations under the Markant brand) to Westfalen
 2017	 A joint venture between Kuwait Petroleum International and OQ was announced for the development of Duqm Refinery & Petrochemical Complex. In the same year, OQ's subsidiary, Oman Tank Terminal Company (OTTCO), began construction of a crude oil storage terminal near Raz Markaz.

The company's logo represents a dhow, a traditional Arab sailboat. The colours yellow, red and blue symbolise the desert, sun and sea respectively.

References

External links

 Official Kuwait Petroleum International website

Oil and gas companies of Kuwait
Non-renewable resource companies established in 1986
International organizations based in Kuwait
Kuwaiti companies established in 1986